Stanley J. Jarolin (January 4, 1933 – May 13, 2000) was a former Democratic member of the Pennsylvania House of Representatives.

References

Democratic Party members of the Pennsylvania House of Representatives
2000 deaths
1933 births
20th-century American politicians